Hamchétou Maïga-Ba (born 25 April 1978 in Bamako) is a Malian professional women's basketball player most recently with the Minnesota Lynx of the WNBA. She is also a member of the Mali women's national basketball team.

At Old Dominion
Maïga was an All-American player her senior year at Old Dominion University, as well as a three time All-Colonial Athletic Association team member. Senior year, she led the team in scoring (13.7 ppg). She wins her first French championship title, which is also the first for her club. However, she did not participate in the French Cup final, as her contract was over, and she had to join her new WNBA franchise, the Minnesota Lynx. A free agent, she had signed with this franchise in February 2010, her former franchise of the Monarchs having announced its disappearance in November 2009.

Old Dominion University statistics

Source

WNBA and overseas career
Drafted with the 10th overall pick in the 2002 WNBA Draft, Maïga did not start a full season for a WNBA squad until the 2007 season. Starting all 34 games for Houston, Maïga averaged 9.1 points per game, along with 4 rebounds, 2.3 assists and 1.7 steals per game. she was # 25

During the 2008–09 WNBA offseason, she was playing in the Czech Republic with Brno. During the 2009–2010 offseason, she is playing in France with Tarbes GB.

WNBA career statistics

Regular season

|-
| align="left" | 2002
| align="left" | Sacramento
| 23 || 3 || 8.6 || .245 || .000 || .467 || 1.6 || 0.4 || 0.7 || 0.1 || 1.0 || 1.7
|-
| align="left" | 2003
| align="left" | Sacramento
| 22 || 0 || 8.6 || .327 || .000 || .400 || 1.7 || 0.6 || 0.8 || 0.1 || 0.6 || 1.9
|-
| align="left" | 2004
| align="left" | Sacramento
| 34 || 0 || 14.1 || .470 || .000 || .552 || 2.1 || 0.7 || 0.9 || 0.2 || 1.4 || 4.1
|-
|style="text-align:left;background:#afe6ba;"|  2005†
| align="left" | Sacramento
| 34 || 0 || 12.0 || .450 || .000 || .314 || 2.0 || 0.9 || 0.7 || 0.2 || 1.2 || 3.8
|-
| align="left" | 2006
| align="left" | Sacramento
| 34 || 7 || 15.7 || .475 || .000 || .563 || 2.1 || 0.9 || 0.9 || 0.3 || 1.3 || 5.2
|-
| align="left" | 2007
| align="left" | Houston
| 34 || 34 || 29.6 || .454 || .200 || .833 || 4.0 || 2.3 || 1.7 || 0.1 || 2.1 || 9.1
|-
| align="left" | 2008
| align="left" | Houston
| 26 || 22 || 22.7 || .492 || .500 || .692 || 3.2 || 1.5 || 1.2 || 0.3 || 2.2 || 7.8
|-
| align="left" | 2009
| align="left" | Sacramento
| 34 || 5 || 19.9 || .486 || .000 || .714 || 2.6 || 1.1 || 0.9 || 0.2 || 1.5 || 8.9
|-
| align="left" | 2010
| align="left" | Minnesota
| 34 || 9 || 13.7 || .384 || .000 || .667 || 2.3 || 0.9 || 0.4 || 0.1 || 1.1 || 3.2
|-
| align="left" | Career
| align="left" | 9 years, 3 teams
| 275 || 80 || 16.5 || .450 || .200 || .630 || 2.4 || 1.1 || 0.9 || 0.2 || 1.4 || 5.3

Playoffs

|-
| align="left" | 2003
| align="left" | Sacramento
| 4 || 0 || 3.8 || .333 || .000 || .000 || 0.8 || 0.5 || 0.0 || 0.0 || 1.3 || 0.5
|-
| align="left" | 2004
| align="left" | Sacramento
| 6 || 0 || 11.3 || .154 || .000 || .250 || 1.0 || 0.7 || 1.2 || 0.0 || 1.2 || 0.8
|-
|style="text-align:left;background:#afe6ba;"|  2005†
| align="left" | Sacramento
| 8 || 0 || 10.3 || .500 || .000 || .667 || 1.6 || 0.5 || 0.6 || 0.4 || 1.0 || 3.8
|-
| align="left" | 2006
| align="left" | Sacramento
| 9 || 0 || 13.1 || .381 || .000 || .800 || 1.7 || 1.3 || 0.7 || 0.1 || 1.1 || 4.0
|-
| align="left" | Career
| align="left" | 4 year, 1 team
| 27 || 0 || 10.5 || .381 || .000 || .600 || 1.4 || 0.8 || 0.7 || 0.1 || 1.1 || 2.7

With Mali
Maïga was the captain of the Mali squad which won the FIBA Africa Championship for Women 2007. By winning the tournament, Mali qualified for the 2008 Summer Olympics. Maïga was the M.V.P. of the tournament.

References

External links
 Profile WNBA.com
 Interview concerning off-season in Europe WNBA.com
 Notice of MVP status fiba-africa.com

1978 births
Living people
Basketball players at the 2008 Summer Olympics
Malian expatriate basketball people in the United States
Expatriate sportspeople in the Czech Republic
Houston Comets players
Malian expatriates in the United States
Malian women's basketball players
Minnesota Lynx players
Old Dominion Monarchs women's basketball players
Olympic basketball players of Mali
Sportspeople from Bamako
Sacramento Monarchs players
Tarbes Gespe Bigorre players
Power forwards (basketball)
21st-century Malian people